Tubbs–Carlisle House or Tubbs House or Tubbs/Revier House is an historic house in Lubbock, Texas.  It is a memorial to the perspicacity, work ethic and dedication of the Pioneers who tamed, settled and developed the last frontier known as 'The Great American Desert', referred to generally as The Great Plains of the United States and Canada.

Construction
Isham and Texana Tubbs began to think of caring for Texana's sister Lizzie Spikes Carlisle who had cared for the sisters' mother Lucinda Pelts Carter Spikes until her death at age 85 in 1902.  This called for the sale of developed homesteads in Wolfforth, Texas and a move 10 miles across the prairie onto 1 1/2 sections adjoining W. A.'Gus' Carlisle's homesite.

The timber for use in construction of this house was cut from trees selected by Isham Tubbs while on a return trip to their prior home in Kaufman County, Texas some 500 miles to the East.  After milling, the lumber was railed to Colorado City, Childress and Amarillo, Texas, as the Railway neared Lubbock, and hauled to the site from those railheads by horse and wagon.  There it cured onsite until construction was begun in 1907 and finished in 1908. 
 
The House was modeled after one found in a magazine picture or catalog fancied by Texana Tubbs.  As the house began to take shape in framing, Uncle Gus and Aunt Lizzie expressed a desire to live there also, so they helped with the addition on the North side of a smaller quarters for their abode.  The construction utilizes pier and beam Queen Anne Styling, from the end of the Victorian Era.  It has 1':1' pitch roofs, numerous cupolas, "fish scaling" gables with "Gingerbread" scroll work, and extensive curved and squared porches on front and a squared porch on back.

As of 2007 (100 years), it has been a residence for descendants of the Isham and Texanna Tubbs family continually since their return from Mexico at the outbreak of the Mexican Revolution about 1910 after an aborted plantation venture that was thwarted by the ensuing chaos of the war environment.  Grandchildren to great great great grandchildren of Isham and Texana Tubbs gathered in the yards and under the trees and porches of Tubbs House for a family reunion in summer 2011.

.

See also

National Register of Historic Places listings in Lubbock County, Texas
Recorded Texas Historic Landmarks in Lubbock County

References

External links

Houses on the National Register of Historic Places in Texas
National Register of Historic Places in Lubbock, Texas
Houses in Lubbock County, Texas